The men's discus throw event at the 2022 African Championships in Athletics was held on 9 June in Port Louis, Mauritius.

Results

References

2022 African Championships in Athletics
Discus throw at the African Championships in Athletics